Three ships of the United States Navy have been named USS Marblehead after the port of Marblehead, Massachusetts.

, launched in 1861, was a gunboat that served in the American Civil War and was sold in 1868.
She served in the Spanish–American War and was sold in 1921.
, launched in 1923, was an  light cruiser. She served in World War II until scrapped in 1947.

United States Navy ship names